is a former Japanese football player. He played for the Japan national team.

Club career
Maezono was born in Satsumasendai on 29 October 1973. After graduating from high school, he joined Yokohama Flügels in 1992. He debuted in June 1993 and he became a regular player after his debut. The club won the 1993 Emperor's Cup, their first major title. In Asia, the club also won the 1994–95 Asian Cup Winners' Cup, their first Asian title. In 1997, he moved to Verdy Kawasaki (later Tokyo Verdy). In October 1998, he moved to Brazil and played for Santos (1998) and Goiás (1999). In 2000, he returned to Japan and joined J2 League club Shonan Bellmare. In 2001, he returned to Tokyo Verdy. In 2003, he moved to South Korea and played for Anyang LG Cheetahs (2003) and Incheon United (2004). He announced his retirement in May 2005.

International career
On 22 May 1994, Maezono debuted for the Japan national team against Australia. He also played at the 1994 Asian Games.

From 1995, Maezono prioritized the Japan U-23 national team. He played as captain for U-23 Japan. In the 1996 Summer Olympics Qualifiers Japan qualified for the 1996 Summer Olympics for the first time in 28 years since the 1968 Summer Olympics where Japan won the Bronze Medal. At the 1996 Olympics, although Japan won 2 matches, they exited in the first round. At the Olympics Japan beat Brazil in the first game. It was known as the "Miracle of Miami" (マイアミの奇跡) in Japan. He played 3 games at the Olympics and scored 2 goals against Hungary.

After the 1996 Summer Olympics, in August 1996, Maezono was selected by the Japan senior team for the first time in years. On 25 August, he played and scored a goal against Uruguay. This goal was his first goal for Japan. In December, he played at the 1996 Asian Cup. He played 19 games and scored 4 goals for Japan until 1997.

Beach Soccer career
After retirement, Maezono was selected by the Japan national beach soccer team by manager Ruy Ramos who was his team mate at Verdy Kawasaki. Japan won the championship at the 2009 AFC Beach Soccer Championship and participated in the 2009 Beach Soccer World Cup.

Club statistics

National team statistics

National team goals
Results list Japan's goal tally first.

Honors and awards
 Individual
 J.League Best XI : 1996
 Japan beach soccer national team
 AFC Beach Soccer Championship : 2009

National team
 1996 Summer Olympics
 1996 Asian Cup

References

External links
 
 
 Japan National Football Team Database
 
 

1973 births
Living people
Association football people from Kagoshima Prefecture
Japanese footballers
Japan international footballers
J1 League players
J2 League players
K League 1 players
Yokohama Flügels players
Tokyo Verdy players
Santos FC players
Goiás Esporte Clube players
Shonan Bellmare players
FC Seoul players
Incheon United FC players
Japanese expatriate footballers
Japanese expatriate sportspeople in Brazil
Japanese expatriate sportspeople in South Korea
Expatriate footballers in Brazil
Expatriate footballers in South Korea
Olympic footballers of Japan
Footballers at the 1996 Summer Olympics
1996 AFC Asian Cup players
Association football forwards
Association football midfielders
Footballers at the 1994 Asian Games
Asian Games competitors for Japan